Blacktail Mountain Ski Area is an alpine ski area in northwestern Montana rising above the western shore of Flathead Lake.

Lifts and Trails
Blacktail mountain has four ski lifts, one triple chair, two double chairs, and one handle tow. The triple chair, called Olympic, runs up the centre of the ski area, with the two double chairs, Thunderhead and Crystal, to the west and east of Olympic, respectively. The rope tow runs on a small training hill for beginner skiers. The ski area has 26 runs, 15% beginner, 65% intermediate, 20% expert, and also includes a terrain park. Two of the expert trails run through an open field of trees that can be skied through.

Services 
The Blacktail Mountain lodge is equipped with a ski rental service, a dining area, and a restaurant. A PDF file of the ski rental form can be found online.

Gallery

External links
 Official website

References 

Buildings and structures in Flathead County, Montana
Ski areas and resorts in Montana
Tourist attractions in Flathead County, Montana